Global village describes the phenomenon of the entire world becoming more interconnected as the result of the propagation of media technologies throughout the world. The term was coined by Canadian media theorist Marshall McLuhan in his books The Gutenberg Galaxy: The Making of Typographic Man (1962) and Understanding Media (1964). Literary scholar Sue-Im Lee describes how the term global village has come to designate “the dominant term for expressing a global coexistence altered by transnational commerce, migration, and culture” (as cited in Poll, 2012). Economic journalist Thomas Friedman's definition of the global village as a world “tied together into a single globalized marketplace and village” is another contemporary understanding of the term (as cited in Poll, 2012).

Overview 
Marshall McLuhan, who was a Canadian thinker, coined the term 'global village' in the 1960s. It indicates the daily production and consumption of media, images, and content by global audiences. McLuhan's views on the retribalization of Western society are prefigured in American anthropologist Edward Sapir's 1933 article on Communication, in which he wrote:

"The multiplication of far-reaching techniques of communication has two important results. In the first place, it increases the sheer radius of communication, so that for certain purposes the whole civilized world is made the psychological equivalent of a primitive tribe."

McLuhan based his concept on the understanding of people moving towards involving personal interactions worldwide and the consequences, as they ensue and operate simultaneously with their causes. The term "global village" means all parts of the world as they are being brought together by the internet and other electronic communication interconnections. Other forms of communication such as Skype allows easier communication and connection with others, especially in other countries. The new reality of the digital age has implications for forming new socially meaningful structures within the context of culture. Interchanging messages, stories, opinions, posts, and videos through channels on telecommunication pathways can cause miscommunication. Contemporary analysts question the causes of changes in community, through speculating about whether or not the consequences of these changes could lead to some new sociological structure. For example, the increased velocity of transactions has fostered international density, making social networks a catalyst for social change.

Within the global village framework, individuals transcend the micro-, meso- and macro-dynamics of their life on a daily basis. Individuals tend to get involved in complex communities of networks stretching worldwide. The increasing density of electronically established and maintained human interconnections can form new socially significant clusters. The global village's implications on human relations are yet to be comprehensively studied primarily in terms of pattern recognition and discrimination techniques. Electronic media have the ability to impact individuals differently for various reasons, such as their religion, politics, beliefs, business, money etc. The time in which messages are received also affects how a message is understood.

McLuhan's approach is a seminal way to grasp what should be happening to the world at large and, correspondingly, what should be done with this in mind. For the Marshall McLuhan approach, the best way is to follow globally the maxims of electronically introduced "ecological thinking" taking into account that "the global village absolutely ensures maximal disagreement on all points".

Global village and media 
People use technology to fit into a digital community to which they are not physically connected, but mentally connected. Each social media platform acts as a digital home for individuals, allowing people to express themselves through the global village.  A Review of General Semantics argues that media ecology and new media have expanded who has the ability to create and view media texts. Since mass media began, it has called for the westernisation of the world. Without the mass media in effect, other countries may not have the knowledge of what the acquisitions of the other nations of the world constitute. Since most of the developing countries acquired the news and entertainment from developed nations like the U.S, the information received can be biased in favour of developed nations which connects the world in similarities within the media.

On the Internet, physical distance is even less of a hindrance to the real-time communicative activities of people. Social Spheres are greatly expanded by the openness of the web and the ease at which people can search for online communities and interact with others who share the same interests and concerns. According to Maria Ozawa anh Shigeo Tokuda , the enhanced "electric speed in bringing all social and political functions together in a sudden implosion has heightened human awareness of responsibility to an intense degree." Increased speed of communication and the ability for people to read about, spread, and react to global news quickly, enables individuals to become more involved with others from various social groups and countries around the world and to be more aware of our global responsibilities. Similarly, web-connected computers enable people to link their web sites together.

Global theater
No chapter in Understanding Media, later books, contains the idea that the global village and the electronic media create unified communities. In an interview with Gerald Stearn, McLuhan says that it never occurred to him that uniformity and tranquility were the properties of the global village. McLuhan argued that the global village ensures maximal disagreement on all points because it creates more discontinuity and division and diversity under the increase of the village conditions; the global village is far more diverse.

After the publication of Understanding Media, McLuhan starts using the term global theater to emphasise the changeover from consumer to producer, from acquisition to involvement, from job holding to role-playing, stressing that there is no more community to clothe the naked specialist.

See also

 Context collapse
 Globalization
 Information Revolution
 Internet metaphors

Notes and references

Sources 
 Marshall McLuhan and Bruce R. Powers, The Global Village: Transformations in World Life and Media in the 21st Century, Oxford University Press, 1992. 

Globalization
Global civilization
Marshall McLuhan
Media studies
Postmodernism
Virtual communities
Community building
Cultural appropriation
1960s neologisms